Zigler is an unincorporated community in Pendleton County, West Virginia, United States, located on Smith Creek.

References

Unincorporated communities in Pendleton County, West Virginia
Unincorporated communities in West Virginia